In mathematics, in the theory of functions of several complex variables, a domain of holomorphy is a domain which is maximal in the sense that there exists a holomorphic function on this domain which cannot be extended to a bigger domain. 

In the  case, every open set is a domain of holomorphy: we can define a holomorphic function with zeros accumulating everywhere on the boundary of the domain, which must then be a natural boundary for a domain of definition of its reciprocal. For  this is no longer true, as it follows from Hartogs' lemma.

Equivalent conditions 
For a domain  the following conditions are equivalent:
  is a domain of holomorphy
  is holomorphically convex
  is pseudoconvex
  is Levi convex - for every sequence  of analytic compact surfaces such that  for some set  we have  ( cannot be "touched from inside" by a sequence of analytic surfaces) 

The main difficulty lies in proving , i.e. constructing a global holomorphic function which admits no extension from non-extendable functions defined only locally. This is called the Levi problem (after E. E. Levi) and was first solved by Kiyoshi Oka, and then by Lars Hörmander using methods from functional analysis and partial differential equations (a consequence of -problem).

Properties 
 If  are domains of holomorphy, then their intersection  is also a domain of holomorphy.
 If  is an ascending sequence of domains of holomorphy, then their union  is also a domain of holomorphy (see Behnke-Stein theorem).
 The first Cousin problem is always solvable in a domain of holomorphy; this is also true, with additional topological assumptions, for the second Cousin problem.

See also
 Behnke–Stein theorem
 Levi pseudoconvex
 solution of the Levi problem
 Stein manifold

References 
 Steven G. Krantz. Function Theory of Several Complex Variables, AMS Chelsea Publishing, Providence, Rhode Island, 1992.
 Boris Vladimirovich Shabat, Introduction to Complex Analysis, AMS, 1992

Several complex variables